The Canadian Championship is an annual soccer tournament contested by Canadian professional teams. The winner is awarded the Voyageurs Cup and a berth in CONCACAF Champions League. It is contested by Major League Soccer sides Toronto FC, Vancouver Whitecaps FC, and CF Montréal, eight Canadian Premier League sides, and the champions of League1 Ontario, League1 British Columbia, and the Première ligue de soccer du Québec. The tournament is organized by the Canadian Soccer Association and has been broadcast on OneSoccer since 2019.

History 

The Canadian Championship is a club soccer competition organized by the Canadian Soccer Association. The championship determines Canada's entry in the annual CONCACAF Champions League. Until the creation of the Canadian Premier League in 2019, all fully professional Canadian soccer teams played in United States-based leagues. Prior to the creation of the official competition in 2008, there was no domestic competition to determine the best Canadian professional team (as Canada Soccer's Challenge Trophy only crowned the best amateur team). Though a notable attempt was conducted by the Canadian Soccer League through the Open Canada Cup, which ultimately managed to attract professional and amateur clubs from British Columbia, Ontario, and Quebec. The tournament was dissolved in 2008 after the creation of the Canadian Championship. 

An unofficial Canadian Champion determined in the same manner as 2008–2010, a home-and-away series with the games taken from USL First Division (USL-1) regular season league games, was awarded by the Canadian national teams' supporters group, The Voyageurs. This unofficial Canadian Championship became less legitimate when Toronto was awarded a Major League Soccer (MLS) franchise to start play in 2007 in the USSF Division 1 MLS league above the USSF Division 2 USL-1 league. Toronto's USL-1 team self relegated, while the other two Canadian professional soccer teams did not play meaningful games against the new MLS team in 2007.

For the 2008–09 season, CONCACAF changed their eight team FIFA Club World Cup qualification tournament from a two-legged aggregate goals knockout elimination format, named the CONCACAF Champions Cup, to a format mirroring the UEFA Champions League with a play-in round, a group stage, and lastly a two-leg aggregate score knockout format for the final rounds. The format change for the 2008–09 CONCACAF Champions League provided the opportunity to expand the number of qualifying teams from different countries, and Canada was awarded a single entry in the play-in round preceding the group stage. The year 2008 was the first time a Canadian entry had been awarded by CONCACAF since 1992, and the first time a Canadian team participated since 1976. To award the new Canadian entry, the CSA created a new competition consisting of a home-and-away round-robin series between the three fully professional Canadian teams: Montreal Impact, Toronto FC and the Vancouver Whitecaps. The 2008 Canadian Championship was contested between May  and July 2008 and won by the Montreal Impact. As the Canadian champions, Montreal qualified for the 2008–09 CONCACAF Champions League.

The 2009 Canadian Championship's format and participants were the same, contested by the three clubs in May and June 2009. It was closely contended by Toronto and Vancouver and won by the former via goal differential in the tournament's final game against the defending champions, Montreal, giving the Toronto franchise its first ever trophy and a spot in the qualifying round of the 2009–10 CONCACAF Champions League. Toronto repeated as champions in the 2010 competition, qualifying for the 2010–11 CONCACAF Champions League. Toronto won it for the fourth consecutive season in the 2012 competition.

In 2011, with the start of a fourth fully professional Canadian soccer team, FC Edmonton, the competition was changed from the home-and-away round robin series to a double-leg aggregate score knockout cup format with the two MLS teams seeded first and second, and NASL teams seeded third and fourth based on league standings of the previous year and the USSF tiering of Division 1 and Division 2. This format mitigated competitive concerns regarding already eliminated teams and the number of additional (extra to their regular league) games each team would be required to play during a season.

On June 6, 2016, Canadian Soccer Association general secretary Peter Montopoli told TSN that plans were well under way to expand the tournament to include an access point for any team in Canada. He said that he expected the expansion to take place for 2017. His statement seemed to confirm other reports saying similar. On March 9, 2017, Canada Soccer Association announced that from the 2018 edition the winners of the League1 Ontario and Première ligue de soccer du Québec would compete.

In January 2019, a new five-round format was announced to include the seven teams of the newly formed Canadian Premier League, bringing the total number of teams competing to 13. In 2020, with the dissolution of Ottawa Fury FC, a modified four-round tournament was announced featuring 12 teams, the first contraction in the competition's history. Due to the COVID-19 pandemic, the 2020 edition was instead held between two teams qualified through league play, with the top Canadian MLS team meeting the CPL winners.

Beginning in 2023, the league winner of League1 British Columbia will join the tournament as a competitor. They will be joined by new Canadian Premier League club, Vancouver FC.

Trophy 

The winners of the Canadian Championship are awarded the Voyageurs Cup. From 1993 to 2007, there was no domestic competition open to top-tier Canadian professional clubs. From 2002 to 2006, the USL First Division was the highest level in which Canadian men's soccer teams competed. The Voyageurs, a supporters' group, developed a method of tracking league results between Canadian clubs to determine a professional Canadian champion. 

With the introduction of the Canadian Championship as a separate competition. the Voyageurs donated the cup to the Canadian Soccer Association to award to the winners. The trophy is still awarded by a Voyageurs member to the current winning club.

Format 

From 2008 to 2010, the tournament consisted of the three professional teams in Canada in a home-and-away series with the top team winning entry into the qualifying stage of the CONCACAF Champions League. These teams competed in the two top US-based professional soccer leagues, which in 2010 was Major League Soccer and the temporary USSF Division 2 Professional League. In 2011, the North American Soccer League received sanctioning as the USSF's new second-division league.

When FC Edmonton joined the NASL in 2011, the tournament was expanded to include all four professional clubs in the country. The tournament consisted of two-legged semifinals and a two-legged final. In the first semifinal of 2011, Toronto, as reigning champions, was assigned the first-place seed and played Edmonton, which was assigned the fourth seed as newcomers to the tournament. The two remaining teams, Montreal and Vancouver, faced off in the other semifinal. This was to be followed by a one-game final to be hosted by the highest remaining seed; but the Canadian Soccer Association decided to go with a two-legged final instead. The format was repeated in subsequent years with the previous year's league placement being used to seed the teams.

Starting with the 2014 competition, due to the introduction of the Ottawa Fury FC to the NASL, the two Canadian NASL teams play in a play-off quarter final to see which team makes it to the semifinals, in which the MLS teams will be introduced.

Due to scheduling conflicts with the 2015 FIFA Women's World Cup, the 2015 edition was held during April, May, and August but did not provide a competitor for the 2015–16 CONCACAF Champions League; instead the best-placed Canadian Major League Soccer team in the 2014 regular season was the country's representative. The Whitecaps qualified for the championship on October 19, 2014. The winner of the 2015 Canadian Championship qualified for the 2016–17 CONCACAF Champions League instead and starting in 2016, the competition will be held in June and July.

Since 2017, competition regulations state that each team must field a minimum of three Canadian starters for each match.

In 2018, following the suspension of operations at FC Edmonton, the format of the Championship was amended once more to allow for the admission of two clubs from the Division 3 provincial leagues: League1 Ontario and Première ligue de soccer du Québec. The two provincial champions meet in a first qualifying round, with the winner progressing to meet the sole Canadian USL team (not including Toronto FC II, which is a department of the MLS side Toronto FC), Ottawa Fury FC in a second qualifying round. The winner of this match joins the three Canadian MLS teams in the semifinals. A.S. Blainville and Oakville Blue Devils qualified to represent the Quebec and Ontario leagues respectively in 2018.

The 2019 Canadian Championship was the first to feature teams from the newly created Canadian Premier League. With 13 teams competing, the competition was expanded to include three qualifying rounds along with the semifinals and finals. The first qualifying round begins with six teams, with three new teams entering each round until the semifinals where the previous year's champion enters. All rounds are two-legged match ups.

Participants 

Permanent Canadian Championship clubs

2023 qualifiers for the Canadian Championship

Clubs that have previously participated

Timeline

Results

By year

By club

All-time table 

 Statistics for Vancouver Whitecaps FC include the original Vancouver Whitecaps who took part in the tournament in the first three editions from 2008 through 2010. This team ceased operations in 2011 and was replaced by a new MLS franchise of the same name and ownership.
 In 2012 the Montreal Impact of MLS replaced the former Montreal Impact of the NASL in the Canadian Championship. Statistics include data from both iterations of the Impact. They re-branded as CF Montreal in 2021.

Awards

George Gross Memorial Trophy 

The George Gross Memorial Trophy was created by the Canadian Soccer Association in 2008 to recognize each tournament's most valuable player. The Trophy was named after the late George Gross, a former soccer administrator and a respected journalist.

Best Young Canadian Player award 

The Best Young Canadian Player award was created by the Canadian Soccer Association in 2019 to recognize each tournament's best Canadian under-21 player.

Top Scorer of the Canadian Championship 

The Top Scorer of the Canadian Championship is the player who scores the most goals during the competition. In case two or more players are tied, the first tiebreaker is most assists and the second tiebreaker is fewest minutes played.

Competition records

Appearances

Top goalscorers 

Bolded players are still active players with a Canadian team.

Top goalscorers by season

See also 
 Canadian soccer clubs in international competitions
 Open Canada Cup

References

External links 

 Canadian Championship on Canada Soccer site
 Canada Soccer Records & Results
 Canadian Championship Final Match Program
 Canada - List of Champions, RSSSF.com

 
Canada
Soccer cup competitions in Canada
Voyageurs Cup
All-time football league tables
Professional sports leagues in Canada